The Mosque of Qani-Bay is a mosque in Cairo, Egypt. The complex is named after Qani-Bay al-Sayfi, nicknamed "al-Rammah", who was Grand Master of the Horse during the reign of Sultan al-Ghuri. It was built between AD 1503 and 1504 (AH 908) on a hill watching over the hippodrome and Mosque-Madrassa of Sultan Hassan. The site was chosen since the horse market and stables of the Citadel were originally located just off the square. 

The complex has a main façade that takes maximum advantage of the view and at the same time exposes itself to the people below. The complex was restored first in 1895 and then again in the early 2000s.

The mosque features on the 200 Egyptian pound banknote.

See also
  Lists of mosques 
  List of mosques in Africa
  List of mosques in Egypt

References

Archaeology of Egypt
Mosques in Cairo
Mamluk architecture in Egypt
Mosque buildings with domes
Mosques completed in the 1500s